The Eurovision Young Dancers 1995 was the sixth edition of the Eurovision Young Dancers, held at the Palais de Beaulieu in Lausanne, Switzerland on 6 June 1995. Organised by the European Broadcasting Union (EBU) and host broadcaster Swiss Broadcasting Corporation (SRG SSR), dancers from nine countries participated in the televised final. A total of fifteen countries took part in the competition.  and  made their début while  and  withdrew. However, the Danish broadcaster DR broadcast the event as did Bulgaria and Romania.

The semi-final took place days 3 before the final (3 June 1995). Like in the previous contests, each country could participate with one or two dancers, male or female, not older than 19, that could perform one or two different dances: either a 2 variations (individual) no longer than 5 minutes each or a "pas de deux" (couples) no longer than 10 minutes.

Spain, represented by Jesús Pastor Sahuquillo and Ruth Miró Salvador, won the contest for the 4th time (3rd in a row) with Sweden and Belgium placing second and third respectively.

Location

Palais de Beaulieu, a convention centre in Lausanne, Switzerland, was the host venue for the 1995 edition of the Eurovision Young Dancers.

The centre includes the Théâtre de Beaulieu concert, dance and theatre hall and hosted the 1989 Eurovision Song Contest. With 1,850 seats, the Théâtre de Beaulieu is the biggest theatre in Switzerland. The Prix de Lausanne, an international ballet competition, is hosted at the centre.

Format
The format consists of dancers who are non-professional and between the ages of 16–21, competing in a performance of dance routines of their choice, which they have prepared in advance of the competition. All of the acts then take part in a choreographed group dance during 'Young Dancers Week'.

Jury members of a professional aspect and representing the elements of ballet, contemporary, and modern dancing styles, score each of the competing individual and group dance routines. The overall winner upon completion of the final dances is chosen by the professional jury members.

The interval act this year was "Moments in a garden of Spain": a flamenco show performed by Nina Corti and her musicians.

Results

Preliminary round
A total of fifteen countries took part in the preliminary round of the 1995 contest, of which eight qualified to the televised grand final. The following countries failed to qualify.

Final
Awards were given to the top three countries. The table below highlights these using gold, silver, and bronze. The placing results of the remaining participants is unknown and never made public by the European Broadcasting Union.

Jury members 
The jury members consisted of the following:

  – Heinz Spoerli (Head of Jury)
 / – Maurice Béjart (Honorary guest of the Jury)
 / – Oscar Araiz
 / – Gigi Caciuleanu
  – Paola Cantalupo
  – Peter Van Dyk
 / – Beatriz Consuelo
  – Víctor Ullate
  – Gilbert Mayer
  – Pierre Lacotte
  – Youri Vámos
  – Jorma Uotinen

Broadcasting
The 1995 Young Dancers competition was broadcast in 18 countries. Bulgaria, Denmark, and Romania broadcast the contest in addition to the competing countries.

See also
 Eurovision Song Contest 1995

References

External links 
 

Eurovision Young Dancers by year
1995 in Switzerland
June 1995 events in Europe
Events in Lausanne